"All I Want to Do Is Rock" is the debut single from Scottish band Travis. Originally released as a 10" vinyl on the Red Telephone Box label in 1996, it was fully re-released by Independiente Records a year later, after the band signed with the label to record Good Feeling. The band frequently refers to the track as their "theme song" or their "national anthem", and as of 2009, have added the song back onto their live set lists. The song later appeared as a snippet on Hellboy 2.

Track listing 
1996 10" vinyl
 "All I Want to Do Is Rock" (Demo) – 4:04
 "The Line Is Fine" (Demo) – 3:42
 "Funny Thing" (Demo) – 5:03

UK CD1
 "All I Want to Do Is Rock" – 3:53
 "Blue on a Black Weekend" – 3:19
 "Combing My Hair" – 4:03

UK CD2
 "All I Want to Do Is Rock" – 3:53
 "20" – 4:06
 "1922" – 3:50

 7" vinyl / cassette / European single
 "All I Want to Do Is Rock" – 3:53
 "Blue on a Black Weekend" – 3:19

 American E.P.
 "All I Want to Do Is Rock" – 3:53
 "Hazy Shades of Gold" – 3:18
 "1922" – 3:50
 "U16 Girls" (featuring The Joyous Lake Singers) – 4:00
 "Blue on a Black Weekend" – 3:19
 "20" – 4:06

References

1996 songs
1996 debut singles
1997 singles
Travis (band) songs
Song recordings produced by Steve Lillywhite
Songs written by Fran Healy (musician)